Revelino were an Irish alternative rock band who were active in the 1990s and early 2000s.

History
Irish band Revelino was based on Dublin’s south side, they released 3 critically acclaimed albums during their time.

They first appeared on the Dublin gig scene in late 1994. The band’s sound was somewhere between the walled guitars of the shoegaze era and a 60’s pop sensibility reminiscent of the La’s.

The band had gained enough attention by the end of 1994 for “Happiness is Mine” to be voted into Dave Fanning’s ‘fab 50’.

The second album ‘Broadcaster’ solidified their reputation in Ireland. Released in 1996, the album also contained the catchy ‘Step on High” which received airplay on the John Peel show. It was later revealed that this single made it into Peels legendary Record Box, quite an achievement given the scope of the legendary DJs musical knowledge.

This album, received wildly positive reviews from the Irish music press. At the same time the reviews perceived the swansong character of the album and it was not a surprise to many when Revelino ceased performing.

Hotpress featured the bands Debut at 47 in the 100 Greatest Irish albums.

2012 Saw the release of 'Saturday Captains', The album by Irish duo Brendan Tallon and Barry O'Mahony is their first collaboration.

In 2019 to mark the 25th anniversary of their debut Brendan and Bren appeared on 2fm with Dan Hegarty to chat about the album and their time in the band.

2020 saw the remaster of the bands debut album.

Discography 
Revelino released 3 Studio albums & 5 Singles during their time.

Studio albums

Singles
Happiness Is Mine Single (1995) DiRT Records
Don't Lead Me Down Single (1995) DiRT Records
I Know What You Want Single (1996) DiRT Records
Step On High Single (1996) DiRT Records
Radio Speaks Single (1997) DiRT Records

References

External links
 Official website

Musical groups from Dublin (city)
Musical groups established in 1994
Irish alternative rock groups